Niphadophylax is a genus of moths belonging to the subfamily Olethreutinae of the family Tortricidae.

Species
Niphadophylax albonigra Razowski & Wojtusiak, 2012
Niphadophylax hemicycla Diakonoff, 1992
Niphadophylax iorrhoa (Meyrick, 1914)
Niphadophylax mexicanus (Razowski & Brown, 2004)
Niphadophylax sophrona Razowski & Wojtusiak, 2012
Niphadophylax spectata Razowski & Wojtusiak, 2012

See also
List of Tortricidae genera

References

 , 2005: World catalogue of insects volume 5 Tortricidae.
 , 2012: Tortricidae (Lepidoptera) from Nigeria. Acta Zoologica Cracoviensia 55 (2): 59-130. Full article: .

External links
tortricidae.com

Euliini
Tortricidae genera
Taxa named by Alexey Diakonoff